Lulwa Khas is a village in the Masuda tehsil of Ajmer district, Rajasthan, India.

References

Villages in Ajmer district